Charles Micallef (born 6 July 1960 in Malta) was a professional footballer, during his career he played for Żurrieq, where he played as a midfielder.

See also
Football in Malta
List of football clubs in Malta

References

External links

Living people
1960 births
Maltese footballers
Malta international footballers
Żurrieq F.C. players
Association football midfielders